Aase Foss Abrahamsen  (née Dommerud; born 27 August 1930) is a Norwegian children's writer.

Early and personal life 
She was born in Drammen to editor Ole Aasten Dommerud and nurse Jenny Bakken. When she was eight, she moved with her family to Kristiansand. Her mother died when she was twelve. She married physician Arne Tellef Foss Abrahamsen in 1953, and they eventually had five children. She graduated as cand.philol. in history from the University of Oslo in 1956.

Career 
Foss Abrahamsen made her literary debut in 1971 with the children's book Håkon slalåmkjører. Her 1978 book Ikke deg denne gang  was awarded a prize from the Ministry of Culture. The book handles the love between Lene and Leif, who has contracted cancer and eventually dies. Videre lille kvinne from 1981 treats the subjects of unwanted pregnancy and abortion. The book was awarded the Damm prize. Her books for adults include For sterk, Birgitte from 1982, Fuglen og den hvite duken, and Alltid de andre from 1988.

Selected worksHåkon slalåmkjører (1971)Ikke deg denne gang  (1978)Videre lille kvinne (1981)For sterk, Birgitte ( 1982)
 Fuglen og den hvite duken (1985) En dag med sol (1987)
 Alltid de andre ( 1988)Timian love'' (1993)

References

1930 births
Living people
People from Drammen
Norwegian children's writers
Norwegian women children's writers